The World Trade Center Shiraz is a mixed-use development project currently under construction in Shiraz, Iran.

External links
Official website (Dead link)

Buildings and structures in Shiraz